Fanhu Station is an interchange station of Line 2 and Line 3 of the Wuhan Metro. It entered revenue service on December 28, 2012. It is located in Jianghan District. The Line 3 station platforms opened on December 28, 2015.

Station layout

Gallery

References

Wuhan Metro stations
Line 2, Wuhan Metro
Line 3, Wuhan Metro
Railway stations in China opened in 2012